The Goulstonian Lectures are an annual lecture series given on behalf of the Royal College of Physicians in London. They began in 1639. The lectures are named for Theodore Goulston (or Gulston, died 1632), who founded them with a bequest. By his will, dated 26 April 1632, he left £200 to the College of Physicians of London to found a lectureship, to be held in each year by one of the four youngest doctors of the college. These lectures were annually delivered from 1639, and have continued for more than three centuries. Up to the end of the 19th century, the spelling Gulstonian was often used. In many cases the lectures have been published.

Lecturers (incomplete list)

17th century

1701–1800

1801–1900

1901–2000

2001 – present

References

Annual events in London
British lecture series
Medical lecture series
Royal College of Physicians